The 2011 Charleston Battery season is the eighteenth season of the Charleston Battery. It is their second consecutive year in the third tier of American soccer, playing in the USL Professional Division for their inaugural season.

Additionally, the Battery participated in the second round propers of the 2011 U.S. Open Cup.

Club

Roster
As of May 27, 2011.

Management and staff
 Andrew Bell - President
 Michael Anhaeuser - Head Coach and General Manager
 Stephen Armstrong - Assistant Coach

Table

American Division

Match reports

Carolina Challenge Cup

USL Pro
The Battery began their season with a 1-0 win over Charlotte on an own goal by Eagles defender Mark Bloom. They then traveled to Dayton, winning 2-1 with goals by Nicki Paterson and Colin Falvey. Next came a 2-1 loss to Richmond with Levi Coleman opening the scoring.

U.S. Open Cup

Statistics
Goals:
 Nicki Paterson-3 goals;
 Dane Kelly-1 goal;
 Colin Falvey-1 goal;
 Stephen Armstrong-1 goal;
 Levi Coleman-1 goal;
 Jon Gruenewald-1 goal; 
 Seedy Bah-1 goal.

References

Charleston Battery
Charleston Battery seasons
American soccer clubs 2011 season
2011 in sports in South Carolina